is a 1999 Japanese coming-of-age film, directed by Akihiko Shiota, that revolves around a series of incidents that tests the friendship of two ten-year-old best friends.

Plot summary

Best friends Akira and Koichi, known to get into mischief, are put in different classes when the new school term starts. Akira and Koichi aren't concerned as they're sure they could continue enjoying their mischievous adventures together.

Over next few weeks, Akira makes friends with Shun, a quiet nerd who's socially shunned for not having a father, while Koichi hangs out with Samajima, a charismatic thug who's been transferred from another town. Increasingly concerned that Koichi is spending more time with Samajima than him, Akira turns down Shun's birthday-party invitation to spend time with his best friend Koichi. Meanwhile, Koichi and Samajima go on a petty-crime spree, which excludes and irritates Akira.

When Akira learns that Shun's mentally ill mother has killed him before killing herself, he feels remorse for not being there when Shun needed him. He attempts to reach out to Koichi, but Koichi has problems of his own as he gets in trouble while Samajima abandons him. The final incident Koichi and Akira drives them to confront each other as a test of their friendship.

Title 

Dokomademo ikō (どこまでもいこう; lit. (a place) where (we) can always return to) is a phrasal expression that conveys "it's okay to go wherever we want to go because we can always return to where we are now," but commonly translated as "let's go as far as it can take us," "let's go wherever it takes us," "let's go anywhere," "let's go somewhere far away" or "let's go somewhere." The nearest to this expression would be Que será, será.

Awards 
 Won: 1999 Directors Guild of Japan New Directors Award - Akihiko Shiota

References

External links 
 

1999 films
Films directed by Akihiko Shiota
1990s Japanese films